Frae Wilson (born 9 February 1989) is a rugby union footballer who plays as a halfback for in the ITM Cup. He was part of the wider training group for the 2012 Super Rugby season and made two appearances for the franchise.

Of Ngāti Rangi and Te Āti Awa descent, Wilson toured the United Kingdom with the Māori All Blacks in 2012.

He was named to the Wider Training Squad for the 2013 and 2014 Super Rugby seasons.

In 2015 he returned to the Hurricanes as a member of the Wider Training Group.

References

1989 births
Living people
Te Āti Awa people
Ngāti Rangi people
New Zealand rugby union players
Māori All Blacks players
Hurricanes (rugby union) players
Highlanders (rugby union) players
Wellington rugby union players
Rugby union scrum-halves
Rugby union players from Wellington City